Moritz Heidegger (4 December 1932 – 12 February 1956) was a Liechtensteiner bobsledder. He competed in the two-man event at the 1956 Winter Olympics.

References

1932 births
1956 deaths
Liechtenstein male bobsledders
Olympic bobsledders of Liechtenstein
Bobsledders at the 1956 Winter Olympics
Place of birth missing